Robert Currey (born 24 September 1955), is an astrologer and entrepreneur.

Career
In 1981 he founded the astrological company Equinox and in 1989 The Astrology Shop in Covent Garden, the first prime location store to be dedicated to astrology, which became a well-known London haunt for astrology enthusiasts. This gained an international reputation due to Currey's pioneering development of computerised astrological reports, and developed a global reach through subsequent outlets in the US and Australia. As an astrologer Currey specialises in Astrocartography - a form of locational astrology in which he was certified by the technique's leading developer, Jim Lewis.

In 2021, Currey became editor of Correlation Journal, the Astrological Association of Great Britain's biannual Journal of Research into Astrology.

Media
Currey has been consulted on and appeared in various televised documentaries which feature astrology. These include Strictly Supernatural for the Discovery Channel,<ref>'Strictly Supernatural (1997); part 1 (Astrology) of 3 part series, narrated by Christopher Lee. Café Productions for the Discovery Channel USA and DVD release.</ref> The New Age for Channel 4 and Solar Empire'' for Discovery TV. He has appeared in the media as an astrological spokesman concerning several points of controversy, including time twins, precession of the Zodiac/13th sign confusion, and on BBC Newsnight to respond to Richard Dawkins. In 2010, his reply to Professor Brian Cox's comment that "astrology is a load of rubbish" caused the physicist to refer to Currey in his televised Huw Wheldon memorial lecture as someone who flew the flag for irrationalism.

Currey has also acted as a trustee of the Urania Trust, a registered astrological charity. In 2016, he was awarded a Lifetime Achievement award at the 26th International Conference organized by the Institute of Vedic Culture and Krishnamurti Institute of Astrology, Kolkata, India. Currey won the Charles Harvey award for exceptional service to astrology from the Astrological Association of Great Britain in 2017.

Co-authored books

References

Living people
1955 births
People educated at Eton College
Manx people
English astrologers
British astrologers
21st-century astrologers